The Petrichor is a 2020 Canadian sports drama film written and directed by Junga Song.

Plot
Maya is a former figure skater who, because of her personal tragedy, failed her first two attempts at senior international competitions. Inspired by her ice skating by Igor Rusky, at the age of thirty she decides to return to the ice and realize her dream of competition again.

Cast
Olga Korsak as Maya
Aleksei Serebryakov as Igor Rusky
Dave Walpole as Eric
 Diane Newling as Chloe
 Evgenia Medvedeva as cameo
Leanne Noelle Smith as Julie
 Amy Tremblay	 as Olivia

References

External links

 
 The Petrichor at the KinoPoisk

English-language Canadian films
2020s Russian-language films
Figure skating films
Canadian sports drama films
2020 drama films
2020s sports drama films
2020s Canadian films